Mario Andre Fernandes Braga (born January 10, 1973 in Rio de Janeiro, Brazil) is a former soccer player, and goalkeeper coach of the Miami Dade FC in the NAL.

Player
Braga played in his youth for Flamengo where he played from 1986 to 1993.

Coach
Braga began his coaching career as a goalkeeper coach for Grajaú in 1995, before moving to Brazil giants Flamengo.

Braga also had a spell with Qatar football club Al-Taawun now known as Al-Khor Sports Club in 1999.

In May 2014, he was named head coach of Miami Dade FC in the NAL.

Honours

Club
Flamengo
Brazilian U17 National (Champions) (1): 1998
U20 Eurovoetball Tournament (Champions) (1): 1998
Campeonato Carioca U17 (Champions) (1): 1997
Campeonato Carioca U20 (Champions) (1): 1997
Taca Guanabara U20 Champions (1): 1997
Taca Londrina (Runner-up) (1): 1998

Fluminense
Brazilian U17 national (Runner-up) (1): 2000

Al-Khor Sports Club
Sheikh Jassem Cup (Runner-up) (1): 1999

CFZ
Campeonato Carioca U17 Serie B (Champions) (1): 2000
Campeonato Ades U17 (Champions) (1): 2000
Campeonato Carioca U20 Serie B (Champions) (1): 2001

Miami Dade FC
NAL (Champion) (1): 2014

References

External links
 Miami Dade FC

1986 births
Living people
Brazilian football managers
Association football goalkeepers
Footballers from Rio de Janeiro (city)
Brazilian footballers
Brazilian expatriate football managers
Expatriate soccer managers in the United States